North Sumatra Jazz Festival (NSJF) is an annual jazz festival in North Sumatra which features Indonesian and international artists. The festival, which was initiated by Erucakra with Waspada eMusic and supported by indiejazzINDONESIA, was held for the first time in 2011 in Medan, Indonesia. NSJF presents its own concept of jazz performance, which makes it different from other jazz festivals in the archipelago. It is the largest jazz festival in the northern part of the island of Sumatra.

The festival

External links

References 

Jazz festivals in Indonesia